The national symbols of Bangladesh consist of symbols to represent Bangladeshi traditions and ideals that reflect the different aspects of the cultural life and history. Bangladesh has several official national symbols including a historic document, a flag, an emblem, an anthem,  memorial towers as well as several national heroes. There are also several other symbols including the national animal, bird, flower and tree.

Flag

Emblem

Government seal

Musical nationalism

National anthem

Amar Sonar Bangla ("To Love, To Sound, Bengal ") is song written and composed by the Bengali poet Rabindranath Tagore, the first ten lines of which were adopted in 1972 as the national anthem of Bangladesh.
The song was written in 1905 during the period of  Bônggôbhônggô (Partition of Bengal (1905)) – when the ruling British empire had the province of Bengal split into two parts. This song, along with a host of others, was written by Tagore, a pioneer of the cultural and political movement against this partition. These songs were meant to rekindle the unified spirit of Bengal, to raise public consciousness against the communal political divide. The lyrics first appeared in the September issues of "Bongodorshon" and "Baul" simultaneously, in 1905. It is said that the music of this song was inspired by the Baul singer Gagan Harkara's song  "Ami Kothay Pabo Tare". The instrumental orchestra rendition was composed by Samar Das. The English translation was done by Syed Ali Ahsan.

National march

Notuner Gaan (Natunēra gāna) is the national march of Bangladesh. This song is written by Kazi Nazrul Islam, the national poet of Bangladesh (also known as 'rebel poet'), in 1929. This song belongs to his famous book titled as The Evening. Nazrul is the musician of the song too. On 13 January 1972, the ministry of Bangladesh has adopted this song as a national marching song on its first meeting after the country's independence. At any military ceremony or function, first 21 lines of the song is being played. It is also known as the national military song of Bangladesh.

Honours song

Ekusher Gaan ( "The Song of Twentyfirst"), more popularly known (after its first line) as Amar Bhaier Rokte Rangano ( "My Brothers' Blood Spattered") is a Bengali song written by Abdul Gaffar Choudhury to mark the Bengali Language Movement in 1952 East Pakistan. It was first published anonymously in the last page of a newspaper with the headline Ekusher Gaan, but was later published in Ekusheys February edition. The song is often recognized as the most influential song of the language movement, reminding numerous Bangladeshis about the conflicts of 1952. Every 21 February sees people from all parts of the Bangladesh heading to the Shaheed Minar in the probhat feri, a barefoot march to the monument, paying homage to those killed in the language movement demonstrations by singing this song. It is regarded by the listeners of BBC Bengali Service as the third best song in Bengali.

Flora and fauna

National monuments and memorials

Shaheed Minar

National Martyrs’ Memorial

Martyred Intellectuals Memorial

Independence Monument

Other national and official symbols

References